There are at least three extant uses of the name "Theagenes" referenced in the literature of ancient Greece in surviving literature which appear to describe different persons. These are listed in the sections below.

Theagenes the Boxer from Thasos

Theagenes was one of the greatest athletes in Ancient Greece. He was born in the city of Thasos on the island of the same name in the Aegean Sea in the early fifth century. He was a boxer and a pankrationiast.

He had two victories at the Olympic Games. One was in boxing (480 BCE) and the other in the pankration (476). He won three times in boxing at the Pythian Games; nine times in boxing and once in the pankration at the Isthmian Games; and nine times in boxing at the Nemean Games. He also won the long distance race at Argos. He had 1300 other victories in lesser Games. 

It is certain that Theogenes was worshipped as a god in Thasos after his death. One of his enemies whipped his statue. It fell and crushed him to death. The people of Thasos threw the statue into the sea. It was stained with blood. The fields did not produce after this act. The people of Thasos pulled the statue from the sea and put it back in its place. Worship continued. Theagenes was said to heal diseases.

Theagenes the Appointee of Cleon in Thucydides
Theagenes was an Athenian, who, in  425 BC, was appointed together with Cleon to repair to Pylos, and investigate the truth of the tidings, which had been brought thence, as to the difficulties of the blockade of Sphacteria. Cleon, however, prudently persuaded the people to abandon the proposed inquiry. (Thuc. iv. 27)  It is possible that this Theagenes should be identified with the person who is mentioned by Aristophanes ( Vesp. 1183), and who, the scholiast tells us, was an Acharnian (Arnold, ad Thuc. I.e.). A man of the same name is satirized also by Aristophanes (Pax, 894) for his swinish propensities. (See also Arist. Av. 822, 1127, 1295, Lys. 63, with the Scholia.)

Theagenes the Athenian Ambassador
Theagenes was also one of the Athenian ambassadors who set forth on their way to Darius Nothus, in 408 BC, under promise of a safe conduct from Pharnabazus. The satrap however detained them in custody at the instance of Cyrus, and he could not obtain leave to release them until after the lapse of three years. Whether this was the same Theagenes who was appointed one of the Thirty Tyrants in 404 BC (Xen. Hell. ii. 3. § 2) we have no means of deciding.

Ancient Athenians
5th-century BC Greek people
Ambassadors in Greek Antiquity
Thirty Tyrants